Trevor Murphy (born July 17, 1995) is a Canadian professional ice hockey defenceman who is currently playing for HC Sibir Novosibirsk of the Kontinental Hockey League (KHL). He has formerly played in the National Hockey League (NHL) with the Arizona Coyotes.

Playing career
Trevor was raised in Windsor, Ontario, and played for the Sun County Panthers AAA, where he played on the blue line with Calder Trophy winner Aaron Ekblad. That same year he had an outstanding 92 points in 59 games.  He was selected by the Peterborough Petes in the 3rd Round of the OHL Priority Draft.

On November 22, 2012, Murphy was traded from the Petes to his hometown Windsor Spitfires. After the 2013 season, Murphy was assigned assistant captain. That season he ranked as the 4th best scoring defence, earning 63 points and leading his team.

After going unnoticed in the 2014 and 2015 NHL Entry Drafts, he attended the Nashville Predators prospect camp. On September 17, 2015, he signed an entry-level contract with the Predators and was assigned to their farm team, the Milwaukee Admirals.

During the 2018 trade deadline and while in the final year of his rookie contract, Murphy, along with Pierre-Cédric Labrie were traded by the Predators to the Arizona Coyotes in exchange for Tyler Gaudet and John Ramage. He made his NHL debut on March 24, 2018, in a game against the Florida Panthers. He recorded his first NHL goal in a 4–1 win over the Tampa Bay Lightning on March 26, 2018.

In the following 2018–19 season, Murphy continued in the AHL with the Coyotes' affiliate, the Tucson Roadrunners. Murphy was leading the Roadrunners with 5 goals from the blueline and collected 13 points in 27 games before he was traded by Arizona to the Anaheim Ducks in exchange for Giovanni Fiore on December 28, 2018. He was assigned for the remainder of the season to AHL affiliate, the San Diego Gulls, helping the club reach the Western Conference Finals with 6 points in 16 post-season games.

After four North American professional seasons with limited NHL time, Murphy opted to sign his first contract abroad, agreeing to a two-year contract with Chinese club, Kunlun Red Star of the KHL, on June 7, 2019.

In the midst of his second year with Kunlun Red Star in the 2020–21 season, after collecting 8 assists through 17 games, Murphy was traded to contending club, Ak Bars Kazan, on December 4, 2020. Murphy registered a further 8 points through 21 regular season games with Ak Bars, before helping the club advance to the Eastern Conference finals, adding 4 points in 8 games.

Prior to the 2021–22 season, Murphy was traded by Ak Bars Kazan to HC Sibir Novosibirsk in exchange for monetary compensation on 17 August 2021.

Career statistics

Regular season and playoffs

International

References

External links
 

1995 births
Living people
Ak Bars Kazan players
Arizona Coyotes players
Canadian ice hockey defencemen
Ice hockey people from Ontario
HC Kunlun Red Star players
Milwaukee Admirals players
Peterborough Petes (ice hockey) players
San Diego Gulls (AHL) players
HC Sibir Novosibirsk players
Sportspeople from Windsor, Ontario
Tucson Roadrunners players
Undrafted National Hockey League players
Windsor Spitfires players